FK Chernomorets Sevastopol is a professional football club based in Sevastopol, Crimea.

Until 2016 it was known as FC SKChF Sevastopol.

Team names
 2014–2016: FC SKChF Sevastopol (Sportivny Klub Chernomorskogo Flota)
 2016: FC Sevastopol
 2016–: FK Chernomorets

History

It was founded in 2014, following the Russian annexation of Crimea. Ukrainian Premier League club FC Sevastopol was liquidated and a new team was organized instead, registered according to the laws of Russia. It then was licensed to participate in the third-tier Russian Professional Football League in the 2014–15 season. As Ukraine considers Crimea Ukrainian territory, Football Federation of Ukraine lodged a complaint with UEFA about Crimean clubs' participation in Russian competitions. On 22 August 2014, it was decided "that any football matches played by Crimean clubs organized under the auspices of the Russian Football Union will not be recognized by UEFA until further notice".

On 4 December 2014, UEFA banned Crimean clubs from participating in Russian professional competitions, and announced that a new local Crimean Premier League will be set up in the future that UEFA will manage directly.

It has the same name as the historical team SKCF Sevastopol which participated in the Soviet Union football competitions. "SKChF" stands for "Sportivny Klub Chernomorskogo Flota" ("Sport Club of the Black Sea Fleet").

Ahead of the 2022/2023 season the club has announced its intention to compete in the Russian Football National League 2.

Squad

Honours
All-Crimean Championship
  2015Crimean Premier League (1st tier)
  2016–17, 2018–19, 2020–21
  2015–16, 2017–18
  2019–20CFU Cup''' (National Cup)
  2018–19
  2015–16, 2017–18

Coaches
 2014-15 Sergei Diyev
 2015-16 Oleh Leshchynskyi
 2016–present Aleksei Grachov (Oleksiy Hrachov)

League and cup history

Russia

Crimea

References

External links
  Archived site

FC Sevastopol (Russia)
Football clubs in Sevastopol
Association football clubs established in 2014
2014 establishments in Russia